Jan Olszanski, M.I.C. (14 January 1919 – 23 February 2003) was a Ukrainian Roman Catholic prelate as the first diocesan Bishop of the reestablished Roman Catholic Diocese of Kamyanets-Podilskyi from 16 January 1991 until his retirement on 4 May 2002. His cause for canonization has been initiated.

Life
Olszanski was born in the peasant Roman Catholic family of Jan and Maria (née Boyko) Olszański in non existed today village Hutyska Brodski (present day a territory of Zolochiv Raion, Lviv Oblast, Ukraine).

After graduation of the primary school in his native village and a state gymnasium in Brody, Olszanski subsequently joined the faculty of theology of the University of Lviv and the Major Roman Catholic Theological Seminary in Lviv in 1938 and was ordained as priest on November 15, 1942, for the Roman Catholic Archdiocese of Lviv by Archbishop Bolesław Twardowski, upon completion of his philosophical and theological studies.

During 1942–1944 he served as an assistant priest in his native archdiocese. In 1944 he was transferred to Roman Catholic Diocese of Kamyanets-Podilskyi, where he continued to serve as a parish priest and during a period of the Polish population transfers (1944–1946) he remained in the Soviet Union. Under the pressure of the Communist government he moved to Lviv in 1946, but two years later was again forced to leave Lviv and returned in the Diocese of Kamyanets-Podilskyi. Here he worked until 1991 under the Communist persecution of the religion. In the same time, he clandestinely joined the Congregation of Marian Fathers of the Immaculate Conception, were made a profession in 1988.

On January 16, 1991, he was appointed by Pope John Paul II as the first diocesan bishop of the reestablished Roman Catholic Diocese of Kamyanets-Podilskyi. On March 2, 1991, he was consecrated as bishop by Metropolitan Archbishop Marian Jaworski and other prelates of the Roman Catholic Church in the Cathedral Basilica of the Assumption, Lviv.

Olszanski retired from office, because of reaching of the age limit. He died in Kamianets-Podilskyi on February 22, 2003 in age 84.

References

1919 births
2003 deaths
People from Lviv Oblast
Ukrainian people of Polish descent
Congregation of Marian Fathers of the Immaculate Conception
University of Lviv alumni
20th-century Roman Catholic bishops in Ukraine
21st-century Roman Catholic bishops in Ukraine
21st-century venerated Christians